Keith Leroy Connor (born 16 September 1957 in Anguilla, an Overseas Territory of the United Kingdom) is a male retired athlete who represented Great Britain and England.

Athletics career
Connor migrated with his parents to Great Britain in 1964. He went on to represent Great Britain as an athlete who mainly competed in the triple jump. He represented England and won a gold medal in the triple jump event, at the 1978 Commonwealth Games in Edmonton, Alberta, Canada. Four years later he won the triple jump gold again when he represented England, at the 1982 Commonwealth Games in Brisbane, Queensland, Australia. He then won the 1982 European Athletics Championships gold and a bronze medal at the 1984 Summer Olympics in Los Angeles.

Connor attended the University of Texas at El Paso in the USA from 1978–80 and later transferred the Southern Methodist University (SMU) where he competed with distinction in the US national collegiate (NCAA). .

Coaching career
He retired from active competition in 1984 due to injury and began an illustrious career as a coach and sports administrator. Connor was appointed head coach at the New South Wales Institute of Sport in 1990, after spending several years coaching on the American college scene following his retirement from competition. He was credited with helping Australian athletes to win medals at the Barcelona, Atlanta and Sydney Olympics due to his work in revamping the New South Wales Institute of Sport. Following his successes at NSW Institute of Sport, Connor was given the appointed as head coach of Athletics Australia in 2001.

The Australian press has described him, admiringly, as a hard-nosed disciplinarian. Herb Elliott, chairman of an Australian Sports Commission review of the sport, said: "There is a view that he has moved the sport forward. He's had to take some very tough action. As a consequence, he's rubbed a few people up the wrong way and some are against him… but he's done an excellent job." In 2006 Keith was turned down for the job of Head Coach to British Athletics Board although he was regarded by most as the best candidate. This was his second rejection by BAB the first being in 1990. Allegations of racism surrounded his rejection.

Personal life
Since the expiration of his contract in 2006 Keith has been a Sport Consultant to national associations, sporting bodies, sponsors and individuals.

International competitions

References

 Marks, Kathy (2001-04-09). Connor makes big jump in Australia. The Independent. Retrieved on 2010-08-25.

External links
 
 
 
 

1957 births
Living people
British male triple jumpers
English male triple jumpers
Olympic male triple jumpers
Olympic athletes of Great Britain
Olympic bronze medallists for Great Britain
Olympic bronze medalists in athletics (track and field)
Athletes (track and field) at the 1980 Summer Olympics
Athletes (track and field) at the 1984 Summer Olympics
Medalists at the 1984 Summer Olympics
Commonwealth Games gold medallists for England
Commonwealth Games gold medallists in athletics
Athletes (track and field) at the 1978 Commonwealth Games
Athletes (track and field) at the 1982 Commonwealth Games
Universiade medalists in athletics (track and field)
Universiade bronze medalists for Great Britain
Medalists at the 1981 Summer Universiade
World Athletics Championships athletes for Great Britain
European Athletics Championships winners
European Athletics Championships medalists
UK Athletics Championships winners
SMU Mustangs men's track and field athletes
UTEP Miners men's track and field athletes
English people of Anguillan descent
Commonwealth Games competitors for England
Medallists at the 1978 Commonwealth Games
Medallists at the 1982 Commonwealth Games